Roberto Laiseka Jaio (born 17 June 1969) is a Spanish former professional road bicycle racer. He retired in 2006, after 13 seasons as a professional with the  team, after he could not recover from a knee injury suffered in the 2006 Giro d'Italia.

Major results 

1999
 1st Subida al Txitxarro
 1st Stage 18 Vuelta a España
2000
 6th Overall Vuelta a España
1st Stage 11
2001
 1st Stage 14 Tour de France
2004
 2nd Overall Euskal Bizikleta
1st Stage 5
 3rd Overall Volta a Catalunya
2005
 1st Stage 11 Vuelta a España

References

External links
 Roberto Laiseka Palmarès by urtekaria.com 

Spanish Tour de France stage winners
Cyclists from the Basque Country (autonomous community)
Spanish male cyclists
1969 births
Living people
Spanish Vuelta a España stage winners
People from Guernica
Sportspeople from Biscay